Corinth is an unincorporated community in Knox County, Tennessee, United States.

References

Unincorporated communities in Knox County, Tennessee
Unincorporated communities in Tennessee